Simaltari सिमलटारी is a place at Malika rural municipality ward number 8 of Gulmi District, in the hills of Lumbini province Nepal.

It is a place on the river valley, bordered by two streams (Khola) namely: Chhaldi and Hul, placing it within their confluence. A 29 kilometer asphalt road connects it to the district headquarter, Tamghas. A school named Shree Malika Higher Secondary School is located here. Bordering local units are Dhurkot rural municipality, Madane rural municipality and Arjai rural municipality. 

Then the Marbhung VDC (now the Malika rural municipality, ward 8) contains 883 Households and Population is 3821 (1713 M, 2108 F) according to National Population and Housing Census, CBS 2011. 

Main occupation of the area is agriculture along with small scale businesses. Connection with grid electricity and cellular network has been well established. The place is on the Madan Bhandari highway and the public transport system is well functioning. Direct buses to Butwal and Kathmandu including other nearby districts operates throughout the year.

Popular religious destination Malika devi temple is few hours walk from the place. The temple location is one of the highest peak of the district. Devotees gather twice a year (Baisakh purnima and Dashain purnima) at this place for puja and offerings.

Location and climate
Simaltari is located at an elevation of about 1000m with the sub-tropical climate. The location coordinate of a point within simaltari is 28°10'29.05 N and 83°07'43.72 E.

References

Populated places in Gulmi District